Lawton Hill is a mountain located in the Catskill Mountains of New York south-southwest of Franklin. Gallop Hill is located south, Hodges Hill is located south-southwest, and Johnson Hill is located east-southeast of Sherman Hill.

References

Mountains of Delaware County, New York
Mountains of New York (state)